Paul Nelson is an American blues and rock guitarist, record producer, and songwriter. He has played and or recorded alongside artists such as Eric Clapton, Buddy Guy, and members of the Allman Brothers Band.  He was the hand picked guitarist to join Johnny Winter's band in 2010, performing on and producing several of Winter's albums, including the Grammy Award-nominated I'm a Blues Man, Roots, and  Step Back, which won the Grammy Award for Best Blues Album, debuted at #1 on the Billboard chart for Blues Albums, and Independent Albums, and debuted at #16 on the Billboard 200 albums chart, marking the highest spot in Winter's career. Nelson is also a Blues Music Award recipient for Best Rock Blues Album, and has been inducted into the New York Blues Hall of Fame and is a recipient of the KBA award from the Blues Foundation. He received a Grammy nomination for his work as producer and performer on Joe Louis Walker's, Everybody Wants a Piece.

Career
Paul Nelson is credited as being a composer and performer for music heard on international and national television broadcasts such as NBC, TNN, and UPN, as well as for the WWF and has been featured in many publications such as Rolling Stone, Billboard, USA Today, Guitar World, Guitar Player, Premier Guitar, Classic Rock, and Vintage Guitar magazines. His solo guitar work can be heard on his first solo CD, entitled Look. He also performed on the Halifax song "Anthem For Tonight" from their album The Inevitability of a Strange World, and featured on the Xbox 360 game Prey.  Nelson also produced many albums, including 14 albums for Johnny Winter's Live Bootleg series (all breaking the top 10 in the Billboard Blues Chart); plus Martin Barre's Live at the Factory Underground (2019). 

He produced and performed on Joe Louis Walker's, Everybody Wants a Piece; a James Montgomery album featuring Jimmy Vivino (Conan B'Brien), Mark Naftalin (Paul Butterfield Blues Band), Grace Kelly (Stephen Colbert) and the Uptown Horns (Rolling Stone, James Brown); He also produced albums for Leo "Bud" Welch album; Lance Lopez Live From NYC; Tyler Morris — Next in Line, Otis — Eyes of the Sun and the sessions for a Junior Well's tribute album.

He executive produced and appeared in the Johnny Winter documentary Down And Dirty, directed by Greg Oliver and also appeared in the documentary Sidemen: Long Road To Glory alongside Gregg Allman, Bonnie Raitt, Elvin Bishop, Pinetop Perkins, and Hubert Sumlin.

Early years

Nelson was born in Manhattan, New York, his love for music and the guitar started at an early age listening to and playing blues, rock, pop, jazz, fusion, country, funk, and Southern rock, becoming inspired by guitar players Billy Gibbons, Jeff Beck, Robben Ford, Larry Carlton, Johnny Winter, Albert Collins, Freddie King, Stevie Ray Vaughan, Joe Satriani, Jimi Hendrix, B.B. King, and Duane Allman. Wanting to pursue music as a career he enrolled into Berklee College of Music, quickly discovering Miles Davis,  John Coltrane and Wes Montgomery. It was soon after he began studying privately with Steve Vai, Mike Stern, and Steve Khan. Nelson soon built an name for himself as an "A" list session player and was on the first call list for guitar spots for many national and international performing artists this later on led to his teaming up with his mentor Johnny Winter.

Today

Nelson has toured the world sharing the stage and or recording with top artists such as Buddy Guy, Johnny Winter, Eric Clapton, Billy Gibbons, Vince Gill, Slash, Brian Setzer, Joe Perry, Derek Trucks, Edgar Winter, Ben Harper, Hubert Sumlin, Rick Derringer, Robben Ford, Joe Bonamassa, James Cotton, Steve Vai, Sonny Landreth, Earl Slick, Dicky Betts, Mark Knopfler, Bobby Rush, Joe Walsh, Pat Travers, Brent Mason, Larry Carlton, Elvin Bishop, Derek St. Holmes, Kim Simmonds/Savoy Brown, Gov't Mule, Anders Osborne, Quinn Sullivan, Los Lobos, Lucky Peterson, Jon Herington, Ronnie Baker Brooks, JT Taylor, Joe Louis Walker, Popa Chubby, Bobby Rush, Ricky Byrd, Mark Naftalin, Ronnie Earl, Susan Tedeschi, G-Love, Jeff Timmons, Jerry Portnoy, Samantha Fish, Uptown Horns, Harvey Brooks, Steven Seagal, Bill Evans, Magic Slim, Coco Montoya, Reese Wynans, Kid Ramos, Scott Sharrard, Ray Davies, George Lynch, Kenny Wayne Shepherd, Ana Popovic, Anthony Jackson, Tom Hambridge, Junior Brown, John Medeski, Ron Holloway, Jimmy Vivino of Late Night With Conan O'Brien, Paul Schaffer's CBS Orchestra, and the Blues Brothers Horns. He has appeared on Late Night With David Letterman and Jimmy Kimmel Live. Nelson released his first solo instrumental album entitled Look and then signed with Sony Music Group for The Paul Nelson Band album, Badass Generation, and tours internationally.

Nelson produced Shaw Davis & the Black Ties third album, Red Sun Rebellion (2021).

Selected discography

The Worldwide Mega-Book of Heavy Metal Bands (Rock & Roll Reference Series) (book) (1993)
Wacken Open Air (DVD) (2000)
Look – Paul Nelson (2001)
Warmth in the Wilderness: A Tribute to Jason Becker – various artists (2001)
Gigs From Hell: True Stories From Rock and Roll's Frontline (book) (2003)
A Return To Fantasy: A Tribute To Uriah Heep – various artists (2003)
A-Z of Power Metal (Rockdetector) (book/CD) (2003)
Beyond Inspiration: A Tribute to Uli Jon Roth – various artists (2003)
I'm a Bluesman – Johnny Winter (2004)
The Collector's Guide To Heavy Metal (book) (2005)
Prey – Xbox 360 (2006)
The Mob (2006)
The Inevitability of a Strange World – Halifax (2006)
Pigswear EMI/Virgin (2007)
Johnny Winter Live Bootleg Series Volume 1 (2007)
Warmth in the Wilderness, Vol. II: A Tribute to Jason Becker – various artists (2007)
Johnny Winter Live Bootleg Series Volume 2 (2008)
Johnny Winter Live Bootleg Series Volume 3 (2008)
Johnny Winter Live Bootleg Series Volume 4 (2009)
Raisin' Cain: The Wild and Raucous Story of Johnny Winter (book) (2010)
Live On The Legendary Rhythm & Blues Cruise – Joe Louis Walker (2010)
Johnny Winter Plays The Blues (Book/CD) (2011)
Roots – Johnny Winter (2011) 
Live From Japan – Johnny Winter – DVD (2012)
True to the Blues: The Johnny Winter Story – Johnny Winter (2014)
Step Back – Johnny Winter (2014)
Everybody Wants a Piece – Joe Louis Walker (2015)
Blues Christmas – various artists (2015)
Southern Rock Christmas – various artists (2015)
Live From NYC – Lance Lopez (2016)
Badass Generation – Paul Nelson Band (2016)
Johnny Winter: Down and Dirty documentary (2016)
Sidemen: Long Road To Glory documentary (2016)
The James Montgomery Blues Band – James Montgomery (2016)
Life of a Dreamer – Yonrico Scott (Derek Trucks) (2016)
10,000 Feet Below – Eliza Neals (2017)
InstrumentHead – Michael Weintrob Photography Book (2017)
Eyes of The Sun  – Otis (2017)
Next in Line – Tyler Morris (2018)
Live At The Underground – Martin Barre (2019)
All I Got for Christmas was the Blues and a Broken Heart – (Paul Nelson and Anthony Krizan - Spin Doctors) (2019)
Rise Up – (Harper and The Midwest Kind) (2020)
Borrowed Time – (Memphis Lightning) (2021)
Consider This – (Patty Tuite) (2021)
Red Sun Rebellion – (Shaw Davis & the Black Ties) (2021)
Hard Case of The Blues – Patty Tuite (2022)
Prestidigitation – Tobin Mueller (2022)
My Time To Shine – Jureesa McBride (2022)
Grab Brothers – Grab Brothers (2023)

References

External links

Pillow Talking's Interview with Paul Nelson
Paul Nelson - Main Man to the Blues Man, Vintage Guitar
Paul Nelson interview - NAMM Oral History Library (2017)

American rock guitarists
American blues guitarists
American record producers
Living people
Year of birth missing (living people)